Rome-Paris-Rome is a 1951 French-Italian comedy film directed by Luigi Zampa and starring Aldo Fabrizi, Sophie Desmarets and Peppino De Filippo. It was shot at the Farnesina Studios in Rome and on location in Paris. The film's sets were designed by the art director Enrico Ciampi.

Plot
Vicenzo works as an attendant on the sleeping cars between Rome and Paris. For several years he has had two families, a wife and scrounging Neapolitan brother-in-law in Rome and an attractive widow with a young daughter in Paris whose existence he has managed to keep secret from the other. When he is offered the chance to work permanently at one location he chooses Paris, but complications ensue when his brother-in-law follows him to the French capital.

Cast
 Aldo Fabrizi as Vincenzo Nardi
 Sophie Desmarets as Ginette
 Vera Nandi as Signora Nardi
 Peppino De Filippo as Gennaro
 Barbara Florian as Mirella
 Noël Roquevert as Robert
 Maso Lotti as  Enrico Nardi
 Nando Bruno as Riccardo
 Geraldina Parrinello as Michélle
 Luigi Almirante as Professor Busi Migliavacca
 Anna Vita as Impiegata bionda alla Stazione Termini
 Marisa Merlini as signora nel vagone letto
 Pietro De Vico as Sposino nel vagone letto
 Julien Carette as Direttore parigino dei vagoni letto
 Checco Durante as Meccanico
 Ada Colangeli as Assunta, la portinaia
 Paolo Ferrara as  direttore romano dei vagoni letto
 Janine Marsay as 	Praline
 Monica Clay	as	Liliana
 Laure Paillette as Paillette

Criticism
Gian Piero Brunetta highlights, with regard to this period, the "progressive integration of writers in cinema", so in Signori, in carrozza! we find, among the screenwriters, the name of Brancati as Alberto Moravia had found in Perdizione, and, by listing, writers such as Palazzeschi, Calvino, Pratolini and others engaged in the new role of screenwriters. Brunetta himself sees this commitment, however, simply as a "recruitment of intellectual workforce for the manufacture of products destined for popular markets".

It has also been noted that Gentlemen, in a carriage! "Is considered a bit of a Cinderella between the films of Zampa and Brancati, overshadowed by the fame of works such as difficult years, easy years, the art of getting by.

Alberto Moravia said: "In this film there is only one really vital reason: the comparison between the scrounger and the scrounger, between the conductor of the sleeping cars and his impudent and insatiable brother-in-law".

References

Bibliography
 Chiti, Roberto & Poppi, Roberto. Dizionario del cinema italiano: Dal 1945 al 1959. Gremese Editore, 1991.

External links

1951 films
Italian comedy films
French comedy films
1950s Italian-language films
Films set in Rome
Films set in Paris
1951 comedy films
Italian black-and-white films
Films directed by Luigi Zampa
Films with screenplays by Ruggero Maccari
Lux Film films
1950s Italian films
1950s French films